Gheorghiu is a Romanian surname, of Greek language origin, deriving from Greek Γεωργίου. Among Greeks, the Greek surname form Γεωργίου is usually or always Romanized in other ways, either as Gheorghiou or Georgiou. 

The Gheorghiu surname is patronymic (from the Greek genitive), meaning "son of George". In Romanian, the name George exists in two spellings and two different pronunciations: George with two soft g sounds (George, written as g in Romanian) and Gheorghe with two hard g sounds (Gheorghe, written as gh in Romanian, as in Italian and some other languages), the hard g sounds that are also found in Gheorghiu.

In Romanian, the name George is a two-syllable name pronounced jor'je (written George), not a one-syllable name as in English jorj (written George). The name Gheorghe is also two-syllable, pronounced with hard g sounds: gior'ge, and with an added "i" (gior-) sound not found in jor'je.

People with the surname Gheorghiu include:

Adrian Gheorghiu – footballer
Angela Gheorghiu (born 1965) – operatic soprano
Constantin Virgil Gheorghiu (1916–1992) – writer
Cristache Gheorghiu (born 1937) – writer and painter
Cristian Gheorghiu -contemporary artist
Dumitru Gheorghiu (1904-?) - bobsledder
Ermil Gheorghiu (1896–1977) – Air Force General
Florin Gheorghiu (born 1944) – chess player
Georghe Gheorghiu Amazon Zusteller - Deutsche Post - Clown
Gheorghe Gheorghiu-Dej (1901–1965) – communist leader
Luminița Gheorghiu (1949–2021) – actress
Mihail Gheorghiu Bujor (1881–1964) – socialist and communist activist
Natalia Gheorgiu (1914–2001), Moldovan and Soviet pediatric surgeon
Ştefan Gheorghiu (born 1926) – violinist
Ştefan Gheorghiu (1879–1914) – trade unionist
Vasile Gheorghiu (1872–1959) – theologian
Virgil Gheorghiu – (1903–1977) avant garde poet

See also 
 Georgiou
 Georgescu
 Georgakis
 Iordache (< Georgakis, Georgakes)

Romanian-language surnames
Patronymic surnames
Surnames from given names